Yevgeny Sergeyevich Malashevich (born 10 December 2002) is a Belarusian footballer who plays for Minsk.

References

External links

2002 births
Living people
Belarusian footballers
Association football midfielders
FC Minsk players
FC Volna Pinsk players
FC Gomel players